Sonnenallee (Sun Avenue or Sun Alley) is a 1999 German comedy film about life in East Berlin in the late 1970s. The movie was directed by Leander Haußmann. The film was released shortly before the corresponding novel, Am kürzeren Ende der Sonnenallee (At the Shorter End of Sonnenallee).  Both the book and the screenplay were written by Thomas Brussig and while they are based on the same characters and setting, differ in storyline significantly. Both the movie and the book emphasize the importance of pop-art and in particular, pop music, for the youth of East Berlin. The Sonnenallee is an actual street in Berlin that was intersected by the border between East and West during the time of the Berlin Wall, although it bears little resemblance to the film set. Sonnenallee was broadcast in the Czech Republic under the title Eastie Boys.

Cast
Alexander Scheer as Michael "Micha" Ehrenreich
Alexander Beyer as Mario Naujoks
Robert Stadlober as Wuschel
David Mueller as Brötchen
Teresa Weißbach as Miriam Sommer
Katharina Thalbach as Doris Ehrenreich
Henry Hübchen as Hotte Ehrenreich
Elena Meißner as Sabrina
Detlev Buck as Sergeant (Major) Horkefeld
Winfried Glatzeder makes a brief cameo appearance, reprising his role as Paul from the East German film The Legend of Paul and Paula.

Plot 
Michael "Micha" Ehrenreich (Scheer) is a 17-year-old growing up on Sonnenallee on the East German side of the street in Berlin in the 1970s. Micha and his friends enjoy contraband records, cassette tapes, and other pop culture yet have little luck with the local girls. While listening to the newest tape Micha has ripped, Sergeant Major Horkefeld, the neighborhood's overzealous policeman, approaches them and confiscates the tape, but then announces he is going to make himself a copy. Micha then spies the beautiful Miriam coming out of her apartment building and we find he is madly in love with her. Shortly after, Heinz, Micha's smuggler uncle from the West, visits and harangues Micha over his intention to join the National People's Army. Later, at a disco, Micha tries to dance with Miriam, but she brushes him off and only has eyes for a handsome young West German who appears briefly, but who is thrown out of the disco by the overzealous Horkefeld. For allowing a West German into the disco, Miriam is made to deliver a self-critical lecture at the next meeting of the Free German Youth.

At school the next day, Mario (Beyer) alters a party slogan on their classroom wall to make a lewd joke and the when the teacher discovers this, she is told Mario did it.  However Micha claims responsibility in a ploy to impress Miriam with a self-critical lecture of his own. After the lecture, Mario berates Micha for getting into "the system" for the sake of a woman. Micha is stopped in the street by a rather grumpy Horkefeld, who it turns out has been demoted to Sergeant for playing contraband music in the presence of a higher officer while drunk at a party. At a black market gathering, Mario meets Sabrina, an existentialist, and feigns an interest in Sartre in order to sleep with her. After a run-in with Mr. Fromm, a sinister-looking neighbor thought by the entire apartment to be a Stasi agent, Micha's father, Hotte, reveals that he has been provided a telephone due to a bogus chronic illness. The phone rings to their surprise and it's Miriam calling for Micha, who runs to a pay phone in order to have more privacy. Miriam asks him to come up and visit her, but he's stopped on the way by Horkefeld and having forgotten his ID card, he is detained for over ten hours.

That night, Mario hosts a party at his parents' house, as they are gone for the weekend. Fueled by drugs, the party becomes raucous, and Micha and Mario escape to the balcony, where they are photographed from the western side urinating onto the border wall below. Miriam arrives to a chaotic scene, and leaves after encountering a stoned Micha, who claims that he has written many diaries about his feelings toward her. The next day, Micha and Mario are called into their headmistress' office, where a Stasi agent informs the pair that the photographs of them urinating on the Berlin Wall made it into West German press. The headmistress berates the pair for disrespecting the sacrifices of the country, and strips Micha of his student stipend, expelling Mario entirely. No longer tied to the city, Mario and Sabrina begin to journey through the East German countryside. Micha sees Miriam, who reminds him that he promised to let her read his diaries. Caught in his lie, Micha goes home and begins to write many years' worth of diaries. Doris, Micha's mother, carries out a plan to defect to the West using a stolen passport and makeup, but when she is waiting to go through the border,  she gets cold feet and changes her mind at the last moment.

Some time later, Heinz returns, and is pulled aside by a border guard who shows him confiscated material. Later while plugging in a Japanese stereo, which uses different voltage amounts, the guard overloads the power grid and knocks the street into darkness. Among the chaos, Sabrina confides in Mario that she is pregnant.  Micha's young friend Wuschel is walking near the border area and is asked to stop but doesn't want hi new alburm taken away from him and tries to run away. He is shot by Horkefeld and appears dead, but as a crowd gathers it turns out that the copy of Exile on Main St. he is carrying stopped the bullet. Discovering the record has shattered, he is heartbroken.

Nearing the end of his diary forgeries, Micha has a sudden realization about his political beliefs, and reneges on his promise to join the army. As he is leaving, he sees Mario at the recruitment station, who appears to be a colleague of the Stasi agent there - and when questioned, Mario confesses he caved in to provide for his new child. Micha is furious and the two fight in the corridor and end up sobbing together.  When Micha returns home, he discovers Heinz – who always claimed the asbestos in East German dwellings would kill someone – dead of lung cancer. Here, the family discovers that their neighbor Fromm is not a Stasi agent and actually works for a funeral company. Doris is allowed back into the West for his funeral, and smuggles his ashes back in a coffee can in order to bury him with their mother. Micha goes to Miriam's house and delivers her the diaries, as the young West German man waits outside in his car, growing impatient. As he opens his car door, he knocks Wuschel off his bicycle and out of fear of legal cosequences if he's hurt, he gives Wuschel 50 Deutschmarks to convince him not to tell anyone. While Micha and Miriam share an intimate moment, the handsome 'Wessi' in his luxury car is stopped at the border with a trunk full of weapons. With border guards pointing weapons in his face, he pleads that he knows nothing about this and reveals that his fancy cars come from the hotel where he serves as a parking valet.

Back in Micha's room, he and Wuschel listen to the new Exile On Main St. album purchased by Wuschel with the 50 Deutschmarks. Wuschel is crushed to find that it's the wrong record, but Micha argues that it's great music anyway and they end up playing air guitar to it out on the balcony.  Below, a crowd of people gathers, looking at them and listening to the music, including Horkefeld who is now reduced to a street-sweeper (presumably due to shooting at Wushel) plus newly-weds Mario and Sabrina and the rest of the characters. The film ends with the crowd getting caught up dancing to the western music and moving to the border where the soldiers in the guard tower join in, one of whom accidentally shoots off his AK-47 while playing air guitar - which makes the crowd laugh.  The film ends with a long black and white shot of the border gates opened and the street abandoned.

Controversy
Writing for Der Spiegel, Marianne Wellershoff argued that the film glorified the GDR and played down the negative aspects of life in East Germany under Erich Honecker. But other reviewers saw this criticism as unfair, and the film was well received by German viewers.

Further reading

References

External links

1990s coming-of-age comedy films
German coming-of-age comedy films
Films set in the 1970s
Films set in Berlin
Ostalgie
Films set in East Germany
1990s German films
1990s German-language films